Passiflora perfoliata is a species of plant in the family Passifloraceae.

Sources

References 

perfoliata